Fly Geyser, also known as Fly Ranch Geyser is a small geothermal geyser located on private land in Washoe County, Nevada, about  north of Gerlach.

In June 2016, the non-profit Burning Man Project purchased the   Fly Ranch, including the geyser, for $6.5 million. The Burning Man Project began offering limited public access to the property in May 2018. The geyser contains thermophilic algae, which flourish in moist, hot environments, resulting in multiple hues of green and red, coloring the rocks.

Location
It is due east of Black Rock Desert.

Origin
The source of the Fly Geyser field's heat is attributed to a very deep pool of hot rock where tectonic rifting and faulting are common.

The first geyser at the site was formed in 1916 when a well was drilled seeking irrigation water. When geothermal water at close to boiling point was found, the well was abandoned, and a  calcium carbonate cone formed.

In 1964, a geothermal energy company drilled a second well near the site of the first well. The water was not hot enough for energy purposes. They reportedly capped the well, but the seal failed. The discharge from the second well released sufficient pressure that the original geyser dried up. Dissolved minerals in the water, including calcium carbonate and silica, accumulated around the new geyser, creating the cones and travertine pools.

Characteristics
The temperature of the water exiting the geyser can exceed , which is typical for geysers at high elevation.

Carolina Muñoz Saez, who was hired by the Burning Man owners to study the geyser, reported that the geyser contains "a really high amount of silica." The silica combined with the temperature has caused quartz to form inside the geyser extraordinarily quickly.  Quartz typically takes up to 10,000 years to develop in geysers. Saez said the Fly Geyser is unlike any other geyser she has studied. 

Water is constantly released, reaching  in the air. The water produced by the geyser contains thermophilic algae, which flourish in moist, hot environments, coloring the rocks with brilliant hues of green and red.

Public access
Fly Ranch is open to small, guided  three-hour nature walks from April to October of each year. The geyser is part of the nature walk. Tours are managed and led by the Friends of Black Rock-High Rock.

Payments for tickets for the walk are considered to be donations and are used to support Fly Ranch and the Friends organization.

Other local geysers

References

External links

 Fly Geyser  
 
 
Images and background of Fly Geyser
Fly Ranch-Burning Man Project

Burning Man
Geysers of Nevada
Bodies of water of Washoe County, Nevada